Easy Pain is the fourth studio album by the American rock band Young Widows. The album was released on May 13, 2014 through Temporary Residence Limited.

Prior to the release of the album, Young Widows performed Easy Pain in its entirety live on January 26, 2014 — four months ahead of the official release date — in Brooklyn, New York. Also to promote the album, Young Widows released the track "Kerosene Girl" for online streaming in February 2014.

Critical reception

At Alternative Press, Jason Pettigrew rated the album four-and-a-half stars out of five, remarking how "Easy Pain reminds you of how horrible the world can be, as well as the catharsis you can achieve if you'd only just immerse yourself in the maelstrom."

Track listing

References

2014 albums
Temporary Residence Limited albums
Young Widows albums